Elwood Davis can refer to:
F. Elwood Davis (1915–2012), American lawyer, civic leader and philanthropist
J. Elwood Davis (active 1915–1920), American football player and coach